The Ingelrii group consists of about 20 known medieval swords from the 10th to 12th century with a damascening blade inscription INGELRII, appearing with several slight spelling variations such as INGELRD and INGELRILT. It is comparable to the older, much better-documented Ulfberht group (9th to 11th century, about 170 known examples).

By 1951, Ewart Oakeshott had originally identified thirteen such swords of this inscription, and had suggested that another, at Wisbech Museum, found in the river bed of the Old Nene in 1895, is also an Ingelrii; supported by Davidson as a possible fourteenth.

Other variations of the inscription have also been found: INGRLRIIMEFECIT on a sword found by Sigridsholm, Sweden, and INGELRIH FECIT on a sword found in Flemma, Norway.

Known Ingelrii swords
British Museum – Ingelrii, found in the River Thames, along the King's Reach, at Temple 
Wisbech Museum – found at Raven's Willow, Peterborough 
Lower Saxony State Museum, Hanover   
Bavarian National Museum, Munich – found in the Danube near Hilgartsberg
Swiss National Museum, Zurich — an 11th-century sword found in Marin, Neuchatel
Sword with +INGELRI+ inscription, and +PREBM+ on the reverse side, pommel of "tea-cosy", length 89.5 cm (blade 75 cm)
A singular sword with a variant form of the inscription, read as +SINIGELRINIS+, dated mid-10th to mid-11th century, formerly of the Frank Unrath collection (auctioned in 2013)

See also
Viking Age arms and armour
Ulfberht swords

References

Alfred Geibig, Beiträge zur Morphologischen Entwicklung des Schwertes im Mittelalter, 1991, p. 124
Lech Marek, Early Medieval Swords from Central and Eastern Europe, 2005, pp. 49–54, plates 6c and 25c

Viking swords
10th-century military history